Harry Céspedes Velasco (born 27 July 1998) is a Bolivian footballer who plays as a left-back for Guabirá in the Bolivian Primera División.

Career
From Santa Cruz de la Sierra, Céspedes started his professional career at Real Santa Cruz in 2016. After playing for Royal Pari FC, Bolívar and Real Tomayapo he signed for Guabirá in March 2022.

International Career
On 16 November 2018, Céspedes made his debut for the Bolivia national football team against the U.A.E. He was called
Up to the national team again in 2020.

References

Living people
1998 births
Bolivian footballers
Association football fullbacks
Bolivia international footballers
Bolivian Primera División players